is a maxi single from the band Maximum the Hormone, released on July 5, 2006. The single charted on the Oricon charts at the position 9.

Track listing
 "Koi no Mega Lover" (恋のメガラバ Mega Lover of Love) - 5:27
 "Louisiana Bob" (ルイジアナ・ボブ) - 3:40
 "Rockin' Agurimotion" (ロッキン・アグリーモーション Rockin 'Ugly motion) - 1:59
 "Johnny Inbu Life" (ジョニー陰部LIFE Johnny genital LIFE) - 2:14

References

2006 singles
Maximum the Hormone songs